Antonio Veić (born 18 February 1988) is a Croatian former professional tennis player and current coach. His highest singles ranking is 119, which was reached on 14 May 2012.

Tennis career

2009

Veić received a wild card for Zagreb Indoors and caused an upset as he beat ex-top 10 player Guillermo Cañas 4–6, 6–4, 6–2. Betfair started an internal investigation after Cañas had been "trading as a rank outsider" although Veić was considered an underdog before the match. Veić issued a brief statement calling the allegations 'ridiculous and unfounded'. Veić continued his successful run following a 3–6, 7–6, 6–4 victory over Evgeny Korolev. It came to an end after he lost to fellow Croat Marin Čilić 6–2, 7–6.

2010

Veic qualified for the 2010 Australian Open Men's Singles draw, where he beat Daniel Köllerer of Austria 6–4, 3–6, 6–7, 6–1, 6–4. He fell to Gaël Monfils 6–4, 6–4, 6–4.

Challenger finals

Singles: 5 (1–4)

References

External links

1988 births
Living people
Croatian male tennis players
Croatian tennis coaches
People from Mali Lošinj